Bikash Ranjan Bhattacharya is an Indian Communist politician and lawyer. He is currently serving as a Member of Parliament, Rajya Sabha from the Communist Party of India (Marxist). He served as Mayor of Kolkata from 2005 to 2010, heading the Kolkata municipal corporation, led by the Left Front (West Bengal) in the state of West Bengal.

Early Life
Bikash Bhattacharya hails from the Kalighat region of Kolkata. He was born in a refugee family to  Nityaranjan Bhattacharyya and Avarani Bhattacharyya. His family was poor and struggled to make both ends meet. 

He went to Kalighat High School, and then went on to join Ashutosh College for his Bachelor of Science degree. He completed his LL.B. from College of Law, University of Calcutta. 

When he was a school student, he started teaching younger students. He ran a free class for children in poor family. He was later recruited as a school teacher, however, he left that job to join the legal profession.

Legal Career
He is a brilliant lawyer, practicing in Supreme Court of India, Calcutta High Court and other courts. 

Bhattacharya is a senior lawyer and leads various remarkable cases like "Saradha", "Narada sting operation", "Teachers Recruitment Scam" among other cases, paving the way to pathbreaking judgements and unveiling corruption in the state. 

He has served as the Advocate General of Tripura for 5 years between 1998-2003. 
He was once offered the position of a justice at Calcutta High Court but he passed on that appointment.

Political Career
He joined the Communist Party of India (Marxist) as a student and was active Students' Federation of India. 

He was arrested in the 1970's for participating in students' movement and spent some time in prison.

He took over the reins of the Kolkata Municipal Corporation in 2005 and continued as Mayor of Kolkata in 2010. He was elected from Ward No. 100, Kolkata Municipal Corporation in 2005, defeating influential Trinamool Congress leader Partha Chatterjee.

As Mayor of Kolkata, he undertook several projects including sewerage systems in the city and took initiative to provide birth certificates to street children. 

Being a senior advocate he has become the poster-boy of TMC government opposition by his cascading eloquence and fiery oratory. 

He fought from the Jadavpur Loksabha constituency in 2019 Loksabha election for CPI(M) in which he faced defeat and received third position behind Mimi Chakraborty of Trinamool Congress party and Anupam Hazra of the Bharatiya Janata Party.

He has been elected to Rajya Sabha from West Bengal in 2020 and took oath on July 22. Earlier in 2017, he contested for a Rajya Sabha seat in West Bengal, however, his nomination was disqualified due to technical issues. 

He was elected as the President of All India Lawyers' Union, lawyers' organisation of Communist Party of India (Marxist) in 2017.

He currently serves as a special invited member of CPI(M) West Bengal State Committee.

Personal Life
Bhattacharyya is married to Ibha Bhattacharyya and the couple has a son. Ibha Bhattacharyya is a consultant dietician. He has five brother and one sister.  

Ibha and Bikash stayed in the same neighborhood in Kalighat and fell in love with each other. They married on 31 May 1976.

References

Politicians from Kolkata
Communist Party of India (Marxist) politicians from West Bengal
Living people
University of Calcutta alumni
Mayors of Kolkata
1951 births